Cyclin-dependent kinase-like 2 is an enzyme that in humans is encoded by the CDKL2 gene.

This gene product is a member of a large family of CDC2-related serine/threonine protein kinases. It accumulates primarily in the cytoplasm, with lower levels in the nucleus.

References

External links

Further reading

EC 2.7.11